The Forge Islands are a group of small islands lying northeast of The Barchans and  northwest of Grotto Island, in the Argentine Islands, Wilhelm Archipelago. They were charted and named the "Horseshoe Islands" by the British Graham Land Expedition under John Rymill, 1934–37. The name was changed by the UK Antarctic Place-Names Committee in 1959 to avoid confusion with Horseshoe Island in Marguerite Bay. This new name arises from association with the old name and with nearby Anvil Rock.

See also 
 List of Antarctic and sub-Antarctic islands

References 

Islands of the Wilhelm Archipelago